Arif Zahir Lopes-Thrower (born April 15, 1994) is an American actor, musician, and internet personality. His YouTube channel, Azerrz, has over 7 million subscribers and features voice impressions of a plethora of celebrities and cartoon characters. Since 2020, Zahir has voiced Cleveland Brown on the television series Family Guy, succeeding Mike Henry.

Early life and education
Zahir is of African-American and Cape Verdean descent and was born on April 15, 1994, in Berkeley, California. He was partially raised in New Bedford, Massachusetts where he attended Nativity Preparatory School and Keith Middle School before moving back to California in 2007.

Zahir began doing voice impressions in middle school to impress his classmates. He originally made a YouTube channel in 2007 which focused on performing magic tricks. After doing so and finding success he started attending Hussian College's campus in Los Angeles. He later dropped out to spend more time focusing on his YouTube career.

Career
Zahir created his YouTube channel in 2012 but posted his first video in 2013. He started out by posting comedic sketches, gaming videos, and videos of himself performing voice impressions of both cartoon characters and real celebrities. Zahir garnered initial success through his voice impressions which he started doing in 2011. One of the first voices Zahir did was of Cleveland Brown who he would go on to voice several years later.

Zahir landed his first acting role playing a character named Arif in the short film No One But Lydia. Starting in 2018, he became a recurring cast member on How It Should Have Ended voicing Black Panther / T'Challa. Through community challenges and his first viral hit with "Ted Plays Call of Duty" (which has over 20M+ views), Arif quickly grew his channel to over 6.5+ million subscribers and 650+ million views.

He is also a rapper and singer and releases music under the moniker 4rif. He released his debut album At Last Sight on August 30, 2019. He followed it up with an EP called Go Gadget/Blues Clues which was released on April 29, 2020, in collaboration with rapper Dlngqnt.

On June 26, 2020, Mike Henry, who had voiced Cleveland Brown since 1999, announced he was stepping down and believed a person of color should voice the role. On September 25, 2020, it was announced that Zahir would be voicing Cleveland starting in Season 20 of Family Guy.

Filmography

Film

Video games

Music videos
{| class="wikitable sortable"
!Year
!Song
!Artist
!Role
!Director
|-
! rowspan="2" |2018
| Down the Line
|Lokl Yokl
|The Bartender
|Ryan Rosenblum
|-
|Drunk With You
|Joe Thomas Carter featuring 4rif
| rowspan="5" |Himself
|Zane Morrow
|-
! rowspan="2" |2019
|August
|4rif
|Fowluh
|-
|''Gimme Ya Lovin|Joe Thomas Carter featuring 4rif
| rowspan="2" |Christina Xing
|-
! rowspan="2" |2020
|At Last Sight/Kids
| rowspan="2" |4rif
|-
|The Window
|Ryan Rosenblum
|-
|}

Discography
Albums

Extended plays

SinglesAs lead artistList of singles as lead artistAs featured artistList of singles as featured artist'''

References

External links
 
 
 

1994 births
Living people
American male film actors
American male television actors
American male voice actors
American musicians of Cape Verdean descent
Male actors from Berkeley, California
Male actors from Massachusetts
Musicians from Berkeley, California
People from New Bedford, Massachusetts
Rappers from Massachusetts
Rappers from the San Francisco Bay Area
West Coast hip hop musicians
YouTube channels launched in 2007
YouTube channels launched in 2012
21st-century African-American people
African-American male actors
American comedy musicians
American male pop singers
American contemporary R&B singers
American soul singers